Bakırköy is a neighbourhood, municipality and district on the European side of Istanbul, Turkey. The quarter is densely populated, has a  residential character and is inhabited by an  upper middle class population. The municipality of Bakırköy is much larger than the quarter and also includes several other neighbourhoods, such as Yeşilköy, Yeşilyurt, Ataköy. Bakırköy lies between the  highway (locally known as E-5) and the coast of the Sea of Marmara. Bakırköy has a large psychiatric hospital called "Bakırköy Ruh ve Sinir Hastalıkları Hastanesi", and is an important shopping and commercial center.

History 
In the Byzantine period Bakırköy was a separate community outside Constantinople, a well-watered pleasant seaside retreat from the city, and was called Hebdomon ("the Seventh", i.e. seven Roman miles from the Milion, the mile-marker monument of Constantinople). Here - where nowadays the Ataköy Marina lies - the Emperor Valens  built one of the two Imperial Palaces bearing the name of Magnaura, while Justinian erected another Palace named Jucundianae, also placed near the seaside. Two churches, dedicated respectively to St. John the Evangelist and to St. John Baptist the Forerunner, the latter hosting the head of the Saint and burial place of the Emperor Basil II, were also erected here.
Hebdomon was a place of military exercise and concentration in what became known in Greek as the Kampos tou Tribounaliou (in Latin Campus Tribunalis), where several Roman and Byzantine Emperors were elected through acclamation by the army.  Among them were Valens, Arcadius, Honorius, Theodosius II, Phocas, Nikephoros II Phokas. The Campus lay in the valley of Veli Efendi, where now the horse race course lies. The imperial court came often to the Hebdomon to attend military parades, to welcome the Emperor coming back from campaign, or to pray in the large church of St. John Baptist the Forerunner.
Later the place acquired the name of Makrohori ( "Long Village"), which was adapted to Makriköy ( "village") in the Ottoman period, when many large houses were built there. Yesilkoy (San Stefano), located within the present boundaries of the district, was occupied by the Russians in 1877-1878, and the Treaty of San Stefano was signed there on 3 March 1878.  By the pre-First World War period it was known as a holiday resort for residents within Constantinople proper.  
In 1925 the ancient denomination was changed to Bakırköy ("Copper Village") by a law suppressing place names of non-Turkish derivation. It was a district in Beyoğlu province between 1923 and 1926 and also at that time included the present Avcılar, Bağcılar, Bahçelievler, Başakşehir, Esenler, Güngören and Küçükçekmece districts, the western boroughs of Zeytinburnu and until 1957 a small part of the Arnavutköy district. It was the biggest district of Turkey before the separation of Küçükçekmece.
There is little remaining of historical significance in the area: what there is includes a cistern (Fildamı Sarnıcı), a powder house from the 17th century (today used as Yunus Emre Kültür Merkezi in Ataköy), the Greek Orthodox church of Saint George (consecrated on May 2, 1832) and a Greek  school, the central mosque and fountain of 1875, an Armenian Church and school and the resting place of the Muslim saint Zuhurat Baba, a Turkish soldier who died during the conquest of Constantinople. His resting place is often visited by women on Fridays. The seafront is now a popular location for tea gardens, clubs and restaurants, (although the beaches have been unusable for decades).
After 1960, the population increased rapidly. As a result of this rapid growth; In the 1950s, rural settlements such as Güngören, Kocasinan and Sefaköy quickly turned into slums with title deeds. A similar development took place in Esenler, Yenibosna and Yeşilbağ around Halkalı in the 1970s. However, Küçükçekmece was the first settlement within the borders of Bakırköy district that showed rapid development and became a separate municipality in 1956.
Bakırköy became a popular residential area in the late 19th century after the construction of a railroad connection to İstanbul and until the 1970s was one of the most relaxed and desirable locations in the city. It is still populated by Istanbul's upper middle-class (tradespeople, bureaucrats, the retired).
Some parts of Bakırköy are very pleasant residential areas, particularly the streets from the hospital downwards to the sea. The planned satellite town of Ataköy to the west of Bakırköy centre is very tidy indeed, and was one of Turkey's first planned residential developments. Ataköy contains much social infrastructure including the Galleria shopping center and yacht marina.

Today 
The centre of Bakırköy is an important commercial district. There is a huge shopping district (including a number of huge shiny shopping centres as Carousel), a range of cinemas, bars and cafés, as well as conversion of streets to pedestrian malls.
Bakırköy is easy to reach by public transport; there are minibuses (Turkish:Dolmuş) to Beyoğlu throughout the night; there are buses to Mecidiyeköy (although using the  highway by bus is unpleasant indeed: there is a ferry boat service that takes passengers to Kadıköy and Bostancı on the Asian side of the city and also to the Adalar (Islands); and the light-railway from the airport to Aksaray runs through here. Moreover, the quarter has a station of the suburban railway line between Sirkeci and Halkalı.
Built in 1913, Veliefendi Race Course, Turkey's largest and oldest modern horse-racing track (not including the ancient hippodromes in Turkey), is in close proximity.
Istanbul's largest mental hospital is in Bakırköy, and the parkland surrounding it is the largest green space in the district.
There is a popular belief that the underground water of Bakırköy comes from the river Danube.
Being near the Fault in the Sea of Marmara, Bakırköy is vulnerable to earthquake damage.

Economy 

The headquarters of Turkish Airlines are on the grounds of Istanbul Atatürk Airport in Yeşilköy in Bakırköy. Borajet also has its head office in Yeşilköy.

Climate 
Bakırköy experiences a Mediterranean climate (Csa/Cs) according to both Köppen and Trewartha climate classifications, with cool winters and warm to hot summers. Bakırköy is, by a margin, the warmest district in Istanbul, with an average temperature of almost , with an especially significant difference in summer. Bakırköy is also one of the only districts in Istanbul with a USDA hardiness zone rating of 9b and an AHS heat zone rating of 4.

Places of interest 
Istanbul Atatürk Airport, Yeşilköy
World Trade Center Istanbul, Yeşilköy
Bakirkoy Synagogue, Bakırköy
Carousel Shopping Center, Bakırköy
Galleria Ataköy, Ataköy
Beyti Restaurant, Florya
Sport venues
Ataköy Athletics Arena, Ataköy
Sinan Erdem Dome, Ataköy
Florya Metin Oktay Sports Complex and Training Center, Florya
Şenlikköy Stadium, Florya
Culture
Bakırköy Synagogue
Fildamı Sarnıcı, Bakırköy
Florya Atatürk Marine Mansion, Florya
Istanbul Aviation Museum, Yeşilköy
Yeşilköy Lighthouse, Yeşilköy

Sport 
The neighbourhood association football team is called Bakırköyspor, once one of top teams in the country, currently a local lower league outfit.

Notes, References

Sources

External links 

 Website of Bakırköy Municipality
 Office of the Governor of Bakırköy

 
Populated places in Istanbul Province
Fishing communities in Turkey
Districts of Istanbul Province